Malaysia first participated at the Youth Olympic Games in 2010, and has sent athletes to compete in every Summer Youth Olympic Games.  Malaysia made their debut at the Winter Youth Olympic Games in 2016.

Medal tables

Medals by Summer Games

Medals by Winter Games

Medals by Summer sport

Medals by Winter Sport

List of medalists

Summer Games

Summer Games medalists as part of Mixed-NOCs Team
Note: Medals awarded at mixed NOCs events are not counted for the respective country in the overall medal table.

Flag bearers

Flag bearers by Summer Games

Flag bearers by Winter Games

See also
Malaysia at the Olympics
Malaysia at the Paralympics
Malaysia at the Universiade
Malaysia at the Asian Games
Malaysia at the Commonwealth Games

References

External links
 
 
 

 
Nations at the Youth Olympic Games